Belthangady is a town panchayat and the headquarters of Belthangady taluk of the Dakshina Kannada (South Canara) district of Karnataka state in India.

Demographics
In 2001 in the town of Belthangady, 11% of the population was under 6 years of age.

In the 2011 census, the town of Belthangady had a population of 7,635.

Beltangadi Religion Data 2011

Population, 7,746

Hindu, 73.70%

Muslim, 12.42%

Christian, 11.46%

Education
List of Colleges

 SDM College, Ujire 
 Vani P U college, Belthangady
 St. Theresa High School, Belthangady
 Church Higher Primary School, Belthangady

Geography 
It has an average elevation of 108 metres (354 feet).

References

External links

Cities and towns in Dakshina Kannada district